Atheists with surnames starting N, O, P and Q, sortable by the field for which they are mainly known and nationality.

Notes and references

surnames N to Q